Bughrahan Skandar (born 11 August 2000) is a Chinese footballer currently playing as a forward for Cangzhou Mighty Lions.

Club career
Bughrahan Skandar was promoted to the senior team of Guangzhou Evergrande within the 2019 Chinese Super League season and would make his debut in a Chinese FA Cup game on 29 May 2019 against Beijing Renhe F.C. in a 5-0 victory. He would also be part of the squad that won the 2019 Chinese Super League title that season. While he gained some more playing time at Guangzhou, he was allowed to be transferred to another top tier club in Cangzhou Mighty Lions where he made his debut in a league game on 14 May 2021 against Guangzhou City that ended in a 0-0 draw.

Career statistics

Honours

Club
Guangzhou Evergrande
Chinese Super League: 2019

References

External links

2000 births
Living people
Chinese footballers
Chinese people of Uyghur descent
Association football forwards
Guangzhou F.C. players
Uyghur sportspeople